Çukurkuyu can refer to:

 Çukurkuyu, Bayat
 Çukurkuyu, Erzincan
 Çukurkuyu, Niğde